Richard Arthur Gadbois Jr. (June 18, 1932 – October 2, 1996) was a United States district judge of the United States District Court for the Central District of California.

Education and career

Born in Omaha, Nebraska, Gadbois received an Artium Baccalaureus from St. John's University in 1955 and a Juris Doctor from Loyola Law School in Los Angeles, California in 1958. He attended the University of Southern California Law School in 1960. He was a deputy state attorney general of California from 1958 to 1959. He was in private practice in Los Angeles from 1960 to 1968. He was a vice president, general counsel and secretary of Denny's, Inc., in La Mirada, California from 1968 to 1971. He was a Judge of the Municipal Court of California, City of Los Angeles from 1971 to 1972, and on the Superior Court of California, County of Los Angeles from 1972 to 1982.

Federal judicial service

On June 28, 1982, Gadbois was nominated by President Ronald Reagan to a seat on the United States District Court for the Central District of California vacated by Judge Irving Hill. Gadbois was confirmed by the United States Senate on July 27, 1982, and received his commission on July 28, 1982. He assumed senior status on January 24, 1996 due to a certified disability, and served in that capacity until his death later that year in Los Angeles.

References

Sources
 

1932 births
1996 deaths
California state court judges
Judges of the United States District Court for the Central District of California
United States district court judges appointed by Ronald Reagan
20th-century American judges
USC Gould School of Law alumni
Superior court judges in the United States